Beyond the Rockies is a 1926 American silent Western film directed by Jack Nelson and starring Bob Custer, Eugenia Gilbert and David Dunbar.

Plot
Con Benteen is an undercover agent for the Cattlemen's Protective Association.  He heads into a lawless town to investigate a gang of cattle rustlers who are known as "the Cloaked Riders".  As part of his cover, Benteen joins the Riders to get close to the leader Cottle.  Benteen's cover is blown and he identified as an undercover agent.  The gang restrains Benteen and leaves him tied up in a shack containing explosives.  He escapes and captures the rustlers.  In the process, he wins the love of a dancehall girl named Flossie.

Cast
 Bob Custer as Con Benteen 
 Eugenia Gilbert as Flossie 
 David Dunbar as Cottle 
 Bruce Gordon as Monte Lorin 
 Milton Ross as Tex Marcy 
 Eddie Harris as Sartwell 
 Fox O'Callahan as Dunc James
 Roy Laidlaw as Dave Heep 
 Max Asher as Mayor Smithson

Reception 
The Western Movies guide describes Beyond the Rockies as a "well made and fast moving production, starring a bit too gung-ho Tom Keene."

References

External links
 
 
 

1926 films
1926 Western (genre) films
Films directed by Jack Nelson
Film Booking Offices of America films
American black-and-white films
Silent American Western (genre) films
1920s English-language films
1920s American films